Stephen Coniglio (born 15 December 1993) is a professional Australian rules footballer for the Greater Western Sydney Giants in the Australian Football League (AFL). Drafted with the second pick in the 2011 AFL national draft, Coniglio made his debut for Greater Western Sydney in the first round of the 2012 season and was later nominated for the 2012 AFL Rising Star award. He was the sole captain of the Giants for the 2020 and 2021 seasons, and a co-captain for the 2022 season.

In the 2010 WAFL Grand Final, he gathered 17 possessions and kicked four goals to be considered one of the best on the ground. Only Geoff Hendriks has won a WAFL premiership at a younger age. Coniglio won the 2011 WAFL Rising Star Award, with a prize of $2000.

At the age of 16, Coniglio represented Western Australia at the 2010 National Under 18 Championships. Stephen represented Western Australia at the 2010 and 2011 National Under 18 Championships.

2011 saw Stephen captain WA and win the Larke Medal as the best player in the competition. As well as being named Western Australia's most valuable player, and was selected on a wing in the Under 18 All-Australian team.

Stephen Coniglio grew up in Perth and as a teenager had to choose between pursuing a career in cricket or football. Choosing football has worked out well for him so far, with the popular teammate becoming one of the most highly rated midfielders in the AFL. In early December, 2019 Coniglio was appointed captain. Off-field, Coniglio is a part-owner of Macelleria restaurants in Sydney and Melbourne and has a keen interest in fashion.

Early life and junior career
Born in Joondalup, Western Australia, Coniglio's father has Italian heritage and his mother has English heritage. Coniglio attended La Salle College, a co-educational Catholic high school in Middle Swan. In his final year, he served as the school's head boy.

Growing up, Coniglio excelled at both cricket and football. He played grade cricket for Midland-Guildford in the WACA district cricket competition. In five First Grade matches he made 111 runs at an average of 22.20 and took five wickets at an average of 42.00, including 3/35 on his debut.

Coniglio played both under-15 and under-17 cricket for Western Australia. He made 106 not out in the final of the 2009 National Under-15 Championships, the highest score by a Western Australian ever recorded at the tournament. In the 2010–11 Australian Under-17 Championships, he made 146 runs at an average 24.33, with a best of 78 not out against Victoria.

Coniglio also played junior football for Upper Swan Junior Football Club, falling into Swan Districts' WAFL recruitment zone. He made his senior debut for Swan Districts against Perth in round 22, 2010, at Steel Blue Oval, gathering 26 possessions and kicking two goals.

Senior career
In September 2011, Coniglio confirmed he would nominate for the 2011 national draft, ending speculation about which sport he would choose to play professionally.

Midway through the season, he injured his thumb, and missed four games after undergoing surgery. In total, he played 12 games for Greater Western Sydney in his debut season, spending parts of the latter half of the season with the club's reserves team in the North East Australian Football League (NEAFL).

At the end of the 2019 season Coniglio qualifying as a free agent. Despite many rumours that he would leave and join a Victorian-based club, Coniglio had rejected massive offers from Carlton and Hawthorn and had re-signed with the Giants for a further seven years.

Statistics
 Statistics are correct to end of round 22 2022

|- style="background:#eaeaea;"
! scope="row" style="text-align:center" | 2012
|style="text-align:center;"|
| 3 || 12 || 2 || 5 || 140 || 118 || 258 || 58 || 31 || 0.2 || 0.4 || 11.7 || 9.8 || 21.5 || 4.8 || 2.6|| 1
|-
! scope="row" style="text-align:center" | 2013
|style="text-align:center;"|
| 3 || 18 || 6 || 5 || 192 || 156 || 348 || 65 || 67 || 0.3 || 0.3 || 10.7 || 8.7 || 19.3 || 3.6 || 3.7|| 0
|- style="background:#eaeaea;"
! scope="row" style="text-align:center" | 2014
|style="text-align:center;"|
| 3 || 14 || 5 || 5 || 169 || 139 || 308 || 51 || 68 || 0.4 || 0.4 || 12.1 || 9.9 || 22.0 || 3.6 || 4.9|| 2
|-
! scope="row" style="text-align:center" | 2015
|style="text-align:center;"|
| 3 || 18 || 8 || 3 || 185 || 236 || 421 || 64 || 98 || 0.4 || 0.2 || 10.3 || 13.1 || 23.4 || 3.6 || 5.4|| 4
|- style="background:#eaeaea;"
! scope="row" style="text-align:center" | 2016
|style="text-align:center;"|
| 3 || 23 || 12 || 10 || 291 || 353 || 644 || 70 || 129 || 0.5 || 0.4 || 12.7 || 15.3 || 28.0 || 3.0 || 5.6|| 17
|-
! scope="row" style="text-align:center" | 2017
|style="text-align:center;"|
| 3 || 10 || 6 || 5 || 130 || 127 || 257 || 35 || 64 || 0.6 || 0.5 || 13.0 || 12.7 || 25.7 || 3.5 || 6.4|| 3
|- style="background:#eaeaea;"
! scope="row" style="text-align:center" | 2018
|style="text-align:center;"|
| 3 || 23 || 24 || 17 || 374 || 269 || 643 || 108 || 116 || 1.0 || 0.7 || 16.3 || 11.7 || 28.0 || 4.7 || 5.0|| 11
|-
! scope="row" style="text-align:center" | 2019
|style="text-align:center;"|
| 3 || 15 || 15 || 6 || 249 || 150 || 399 || 63 || 59 || 1.0 || 0.4 || 16.6 || 10.0 || 26.6 || 4.2 || 3.9|| 17
|- style="background:#eaeaea;"
! scope="row" style="text-align:center" | 2020
|style="text-align:center;"|
| 3 || 16 || 5 || 8 || 196 || 141 || 337 || 44 || 62 || 0.3 || 0.5 || 12.3 || 8.8 || 21.1 || 2.8 || 3.9|| 4
|- style="background:#eaeaea;"
! scope= ! scope="row" style="text-align:center" | 2021
|style="text-align:center;"|
| 3 || 7 || 1 || 4 || 61 || 42 || 103 || 14 || 23 || 0.14 || 1.33 || 8.71 || 6 || 14.7 || 2.8 || 3.28 || 0
|- style="background:#eaeaea;"
! scope= ! scope="row" style="text-align:center" | 2022
|style="text-align:center;"|
| 3 || 20 || 17 || 11 || 269 || 235 || 504 || 74 || 106 || 0.8 || 0.5 || 13.4 || 11.7 || 25.2 || 3.7 || 5.3 || TBA
|-
|- class="sortbottom"
! colspan=3| Career
! 176
! 101
! 79
! 2256
! 1966
! 4222
! 646
! 827
! 0.5
! 0.4
! 12.8
! 11.1
! 23.9
! 3.6
! 4.6
! 59
|}

Notes

References

External links

 
 

1993 births
Australian people of Italian descent
Australian people of English descent
Greater Western Sydney Giants players
Living people
People educated at La Salle College, Perth
Australian rules footballers from Perth, Western Australia
Swan Districts Football Club players
AFL Academy graduates